The following covers the events of the 2008 Sri Lanka Football Premier League.

The 2008 Premier League championship was organized by the Football Federation of Sri Lanka, and by Dialog Telekom. Army SC won the championship after its win over Rathnam SC. Kasun Jayasooriya of Renown SC was the top scorer in the league.

Teams

Both Pelicans SC and Java Lane SC were relegated to Division I because they were the last two teams on the table

Semi-finals
Rathnam SC 4-1 Negambo Youth SC
SL Air Force SC 0-2 Army SC

Finals
Rathnam SC 1-2 Army SC

References
 http://www.rsssf.com/tabless/srilanka08a.html

Sri Lanka Football Premier League seasons
1
1
Sri Lanka
Sri Lanka